The  was a tramcar type operated by Tokyo Metropolitan Bureau of Transportation (Toei) on the Toden Arakawa Line in Tokyo, Japan from 1962 until March 2011.

Operations
The fleet was based at Arakawa Depot, operating on the sole remaining tram line in Tokyo, the Toden Arakawa Line.

History
20 7500 series tramcars were introduced from 1962.

The last two remaining 7500 series cars in service were withdrawn on 13 March 2011.

Preserved examples
 7506, at Ikenohata Park in Taito Ward, Tokyo
 7514, at the Edo-Tokyo Open Air Architectural Museum

References

Electric multiple units of Japan
Tokyo Metropolitan Bureau of Transportation
Train-related introductions in 1962
600 V DC multiple units